Separation is a 2021 American supernatural horror film directed by William Brent Bell, from a screenplay by Nick Amadeus and Josh Braun. It stars Rupert Friend, Mamie Gummer, Madeline Brewer, Violet McGraw, Simon Quarterman, and Brian Cox. The film follows a father who must take care of his daughter, after his wife, who filed for divorce, suddenly dies in an accident, as the two become haunted by a mysterious entity.

Separation was released on April 30, 2021, by Open Road Films and Briarcliff Entertainment. It received mainly negative reviews from critics.

Plot
An illustrator named Jeff Vahn is forced into divorce by his wife, Maggie. After their daughter, Jenny, falls from an attic board while Jeff is not watching her, Maggie grows even more angered by him and makes it her mission to not allow Jenny to be around him until he gets his life in order. During the divorce case, Maggie tries in vain to become closer to Jenny, who has a strained relationship with her, and Jeff is reminiscing about his earlier days of marriage and fatherhood.

Distraught at the possibility of losing the divorce case and failing at his career, Jeff considers signing to all of Maggie's agreements, hitting rock bottom. He calls Maggie to speak about the conditions and the two argue, but while Maggie is wrapped up in the arguing she is fatally run over. Much time later the funeral is disastrous as Jeff's father-in-law Paul Rivers makes a scene at the funeral and Jenny is unable to understand that Maggie has died. As Jeff gives a thoughtless eulogy, an unwanted portrait of the family which Maggie was known to dislike, lights on fire melting only the painted face of Jeff and leaving the other members of the family untouched.

Since then, strange happenings occur around the house, and Jeff has recurring nightmares of spirits lurking around their house. Meanwhile, as Jenny begins to understand the consequences of death, she grows distant from her father, and Paul prepares to sue Jeff for custody after seeing his tactless treatment of Jenny. Jenny reverts to state of depression and begins acting strange, and Jeff loses his job and is unable to comfort or help her. In hopes of getting employed again Jeff reaches out to an old friend for a smaller job opportunity. In a trance Jeff draws a peculiar figure, and it is shown that the same figure is watching over Jenny.

Jeff hires a babysitter named Samantha Nally to watch over Jenny as he begins work in his new career. Samantha attempts to be a mother figure to Jenny, much to her disdain as she sinks deeper into depression. The house is revealed to be inhabited by spirits who possess some of Jenny's puppet toys, and Jeff keeps reverting into trances where he draws frightening creatures who the spirits bring to life. However, these spirits begin interacting with Jenny, and when she tries to tell Samantha, she realizes that she is the only one who can see them. When the motives and true identities of the spirits are revealed, everyone's lives are put in danger, and Maggie may have returned.

Cast
 Rupert Friend as Jeff Vahn
 Mamie Gummer as Maggie Vahn
 Madeline Brewer as Samantha Nally
 Brian Cox as Paul Rivers
 Violet McGraw as Jenny Vahn
 Simon Quarterman as Alan Ross
 Mark Pettograsso as Brian Cox's stunt double
 Eric Troy Miller as Connor Gibbons 
 Manny Perez as Officer Pitt
 Lorrie Odom as Officer Rossi
 Lilah Shreeve as Barista
 Chelsea Debo as Cori
 Kayla Wesley as Young Jenny
 Ratnesh Dubey as Male Paramedic
 Trey Ellett as Dad
 Anna Maria Vargas as Teenage Girl

Production
In October 2018, it was announced Rupert Friend would star in the film, with William Brent Bell directing from a screenplay by Nick Amadeus and Josh Braun. Bell, Jordan Yale Levine, Jordan Beckerman, Russ Posternak, Jesse Korman,  Clay Pecorin and Russell Geyser, were announced as producers under their Yale Productions and RainMaker Films banners, respectively. In November 2018, Mamie Gummer, Madeline Brewer, Brian Cox and Violet McGraw joined the cast of the film.

In early 2020, the film was in final stages of post-production.

Release
In March 2021, Open Road Films and Briarcliff Entertainment acquired distribution rights to the film, and set it for an April 23, 2021, release. It was then pushed back to April 30, 2021.

Reception

Box office 
The film made $1.8 million from 1,751 theaters in its opening weekend, finishing fourth at the box office. It fell 40% in its second weekend to $1.1 million, finishing sixth.

Critical response 
 Audiences surveyed by PostTrak gave the film a 42% positive score, with 27% saying they would definitely recommend it.

Nick Schager of Variety called the film's story "a dull and misogynistic affair that imagines multiple types of women as malevolent fiends who terrorize supposedly sympathetic men", and criticized its script and performances. Frank Scheck of The Hollywood Reporter wrote that the film "attempts to inject scares into a Kramer vs. Kramer-inspired scenario", but "squanders its intriguing setup and terrific performances by devolving into familiar genre tropes." A. A. Dowd of The A.V. Club gave the film a D grade, writing: "this bargain-basement thriller approaches both its jack-in-the-box scares and its domestic scenario with the negligence of an unfit parent; it will spook neither the superstitious nor the matrimonially anxious." Brian Tallerico of RogerEbert.com gave the film 0/4 stars, calling it "a movie that fails as both a domestic drama and as a horror flick" and "a viciously misogynistic film that feels like the result of a drunk guy at a bar wondering if his ex-wife is so cruel that she would haunt him from beyond the grave."

References

External links
 

2021 films
2021 horror films
2020s English-language films
2020s ghost films
2020s supernatural horror films
American ghost films
American supernatural horror films
Demons in film
Films about spirit possession
Films directed by William Brent Bell
Films scored by Brett Detar
Open Road Films films
2020s American films